Patriot, a 1991 compilation album by the American singer-songwriter Johnny Cash, collects some of Cash's patriotic songs released on Columbia Records. The album contains 10 tracks from Cash's long stint with Columbia, from 1958 to 1987, including two songs not commonly found on other Cash releases: The opening track, "Song of the Patriot", was originally released on the 1981 compilation album Encore, and the ninth track, "Singing in Vietnam Talking Blues", comes from the 1971 vinyl album Man in Black and sees its first release on CD here.

Track listing
 

1991 compilation albums
Johnny Cash compilation albums
Columbia Records compilation albums